The Sounds of '66 is a 1966 live album by Sammy Davis Jr., accompanied by Buddy Rich and a big band.

The album was recorded at the Sands Hotel on the Las Vegas Strip.

Track listing

Original LP
Side A
 "Come Back to Me" (Burton Lane, Alan Jay Lerner) – 2:56 
 "I Know a Place" (Tony Hatch) – 2:27 
 "What Did I Have That I Don't Have?" (Lane, Lerner) – 3:43 
 "What the World Needs Now Is Love" (Burt Bacharach, Hal David) – 3:05 
 "Once in Love With Amy" (Frank Loesser) – 2:45 
Side B
 "Ding-Dong! The Witch Is Dead" (Harold Arlen, Yip Harburg) – 1:49 
 "What Now My Love?" (Gilbert Bécaud, Pierre Delanoë, Carl Sigman) – 3:08 
 "What Kind of Fool Am I?" (Leslie Bricusse, Anthony Newley) – 3:07 
 "If It's the Last Thing I Do" (Sammy Cahn, Saul Chaplin) – 3:24 
 "Please Don't Talk About Me When I'm Gone" (Sidney Clare, Sam H. Stept) – 3:18

CD re-issue
 Introduction by Sammy Davis Jr.
 "Come Back to Me" (Burton Lane, Alan Jay Lerner) – 4:12 
 "The Birth of the Blues" (Lew Brown, Buddy DeSylva, Ray Henderson) – CD bonus track
 "I Know a Place" (Tony Hatch) – 2:27 
 "What Did I Have That I Don't Have?" (Lane, Lerner) – 3:43 
 "What the World Needs Now Is Love" (Burt Bacharach, Hal David) – 3:04 
 "Once in Love With Amy" (Frank Loesser) – 2:45 
 "Ding-Dong! The Witch Is Dead" (Harold Arlen, Yip Harburg) – 1:48 
 "What Now My Love?" (Gilbert Bécaud, Pierre Delanoë, Carl Sigman) – 3:07 
 "What Kind of Fool Am I?" (Leslie Bricusse, Anthony Newley) – 3:07 
 "If It's the Last Thing I Do" (Sammy Cahn, Saul Chaplin) – 3:24 
 Closing remarks by Sammy Davis, Jr.
 "Please Don't Talk About Me When I'm Gone" (Sidney Clare, Sam H. Stept) – 3:26

Personnel
Sammy Davis Jr. – vocal
Buddy Rich – drums
The Buddy Rich Big Band
Gary Walters – bass
John Bunch – piano
Barry Zweig – guitar
Bob Faust – trumpet 
Chuck Foster – trumpet  
Tony Scodwell – trumpet  
John Sottile – trumpet 
John Boice – trombone 
Bob Braun – trombone 
Jim Trimble – trombone  
Jay Corre – saxophone
Marty Flax – saxophone 
Tom Hall – saxophone 
Sam Most – saxophone 
Steve Perlow – saxophone
Ernie Freeman – arranger
George Rhodes – arranger

References

Sammy Davis Jr. live albums
Buddy Rich live albums
albums arranged by Ernie Freeman
Albums produced by Jimmy Bowen
1966 live albums
Albums recorded at the Sands Hotel
Reprise Records live albums